The Roma 2020 World Cup in weightlifting was held in Rome, Italy from 27 to 31 January 2020. It was also a qualification event for the 2020 Summer Olympics in Tokyo.

Medal overview

Men

Women

References

External links
Results
Results book (Archived version)

IWF World Cup
2020 in weightlifting
Roma 2020 World Cup
2020
Roma 2020 World Cup
2020